The Germany national rugby union team is the national team of the third-tier rugby union-playing nation Germany. They first played in 1927 and have yet to qualify for the Rugby World Cup. Rugby union in Germany is administered by the Deutscher Rugby-Verband.
The German National Team regularly compete in the European Nations Cup, the senior men's rugby tournament for European nations below the Six Nations. Following victory in Division 2A of that tournament in 2006–08, Germany competed in Division One, the top tier of the European Nations Cup for 2008-10 but was relegated again immediately.

This is a list of games played by the German team against other nations and selections. Non-national team selections like second or amateur teams are distinguished by XV behind the union's name.

Internationals
Germany's results according to the German Rugby Federation:

1920s

1930s

1940s

1950s

1960s

1970s

1980s

1990s

 1 Not recognised by Namibia as an official test match.
 2 Points awarded to Germany due to Netherlands using an ineligible player.

2000s

2010s

Matches against other teams
This list is incomplete.

 German wins in bold.
 Locations of German home games in bold.

Record of international matches

Germany 1927 to 1940

Federal Republic of Germany
As of 20 March 2016:

See also
 List of German Democratic Republic national rugby union team results

References

External links
  Deutscher Rugby-Verband – official site
  Totalrugby.de – German rugby website with news and results
 Scrum.com: List of Germany international matches

Germany
Germany national rugby union team